This is a list of notable alumni of Trinity College, Cambridge. Some of the alumni noted are connected to Trinity through honorary degrees; not all studied at the College.

Politicians

Prime Ministers
 Stanley Baldwin, 1st Earl Baldwin of Bewdley (1867–1947), Prime Minister 1923–24, 1924–29, 1935–37 (Conservative)
 Arthur Balfour, 1st Earl of Balfour (1848–1930), Prime Minister 1902–1905 (Conservative)
 Sir Henry Campbell-Bannerman (1836–1908), Prime Minister 1905–1908 (Liberal)
 Rajiv Gandhi (1944–1991), Prime Minister of India, 1984–1989
 Charles Grey, 2nd Earl Grey (1764–1845), Prime Minister 1830–1834 (Whig); Great Reform Act (1832)
 William Lamb, 2nd Viscount Melbourne (1779–1848), Prime Minister 1834, 1835–1841 (Whig)
 Lee Hsien Loong (born 1952), Prime Minister of Singapore, 2004–present
 Jawaharlal Nehru (1889–1964), first Prime Minister of India, 1949–1964
 Anand Panyarachun (born 1932), Prime Minister of Thailand, 1991–1992 and again in 1992
 Spencer Perceval (1762–1812), Prime Minister 1809–1812 (Tory); assassinated
 William Waddington (1826–1894), French Prime Minister 1879; archaeologist

United Kingdom
 Sir Francis Bacon (1561–1626), lawyer, philosopher; Lord Chancellor
 Gavin Barwell (born 1972), Downing Street Chief of Staff under Theresa May
 Spencer Cavendish, 8th Duke of Devonshire (also known as Marquess of Hartington) (1833–1908), politician
 Hugh Childers (1827–1896), Australian statesman, then British Chancellor of the Exchequer
 Sir Edward Coke (1552–1634), lawyer, politician; Chief Justice of the King's Bench
 Sir John Coke (1563–1644), politician
 John Donaldson, Baron Donaldson of Lymington (1920–2005), Master of the Rolls
 Hugh Elliott, UK Ambassador to Spain and Andorra
 Frederick James Erroll, 1st Baron Erroll of Hale (1914–2000), British Minister
 Thomas Erskine, 1st Baron Erskine (1750–1823), Lord Chancellor, jurist
 Vicky Ford, Conservative MP for Chelmsford
 Sir Michael Foster (1836–1907), physiologist; MP (London University)
 Henry Goulburn (1784–1856), Chancellor of the Exchequer
 Roland Gwynne (1882–1971), politician and lover of suspected serial killer John Bodkin Adams
 Sir William Vernon Harcourt (1827–1904), Liberal statesman; home secretary, Chancellor of the Exchequer
 Douglas Hurd (born 1930), Conservative politician, Home Secretary, Foreign Secretary
 George Jellicoe, 2nd Earl Jellicoe (1918–2007), statesman
 Kwasi Kwarteng (born 1975), Conservative politician, Chancellor of the Exchequer, Secretary of State for Business, Energy and Industrial Strategy
 James Mackay, Baron Mackay of Clashfern (born 1927), Lord Chancellor 1987–1997
 John Manners, 7th Duke of Rutland (also known as Lord John Manners) (1818–1906), Conservative statesman
 Sir Philip Miles (1825–1888), politician
 Richard Monckton Milnes, 1st Baron Houghton (1809–1885), politician, man of letters
 Charles Montagu, 1st Duke of Manchester (1656–1722), Whig statesman
 Charles Montagu, 1st Earl of Halifax (1661–1715), founder of Bank of England, 1694; Chancellor of Exchequer
 John Montagu, 4th Earl of Sandwich (1718–1792), First Lord of the Admiralty; is claimed to have invented the sandwich
 George Montague-Dunk, 2nd Earl of Halifax (1716–1771), Secretary of State
 Helen Morgan, Liberal Democrat MP for North Shropshire
 Ernest Noel (1831–1931), MP for Dumfries Burghs, 1874–1886
 Anthony Nutting (1920–1999), politician and diplomat; Arabist
 Charles Pepys, 1st Earl of Cottenham (1781–1851), lawyer, Lord Chancellor, 1846–1850
 Henry Petty-Fitzmaurice, 3rd Marquess of Lansdowne (1780–1863), Whig statesman
 Constantine Henry Phipps, 1st Marquess of Normanby (1797–1863), politician
 Enoch Powell (1912–1998), statesman; Minister of Health, 1960–3
 Francis Russell, 5th Duke of Bedford (1765–1802), Whig aristocrat
 Charles Seymour, 6th Duke of Somerset (1662–1748), politician and Whig Grandee
 John Charles Spencer, 3rd Earl Spencer (1782–1845), known as Lord Althorp; Chancellor of the Exchequer
 Edward Stanley, 15th Earl of Derby (1826–1893), Foreign Secretary
 William Whitelaw, 1st Viscount Whitelaw (1918–1999), statesman; Home Secretary, 1979–83

International
 Richard Blumenthal (born 1946), Senior U.S. Senator from Connecticut
 Puran Singh Bundela (born 1950), Indian politician
 Erskine Hamilton Childers (1905–1974), 4th President of Ireland, 1973–74
 Freeman Freeman-Thomas, 1st Marquess of Willingdon (1866–1941), administrator; Viceroy of India
 Rahul Gandhi (born 1970), Member of Parliament (Lok Sabha) for Wayanad and Former President of the Indian National Congress 
 Albert Grey, 4th Earl Grey (1851–1917), Governor-General of Canada, 1904–1911
 Charles Hawker (1894–1938), Australian politician
 Thomas Nelson (1738–1789), signatory of the American Declaration of Independence
 James Peter Obeyesekere (1915–2007), aviator and Sri Lankan minister
 John Winthrop (1587/8–1649), founder and first governor of Massachusetts

Royalty

 King Charles III (born 1948)
 King Edward VII (1841–1910), reigned 1901–1910
 King George VI (1895–1952), reigned 1936–1952
 Prince Ranjitsinhji (1872–1933), cricketer; Indian prince
 Prince Henry, Duke of Gloucester (1900-1974), British prince 
 Prince Albert Victor, Duke of Clarence and Avondale (1864-1892), British prince 
 Prince William Frederick, Duke of Gloucester and Edinburgh (1776-1834), British prince

Clergy
 Alfred Barry (1826–1920), Principal of King's College London (1868–1883), educationalist, and former Bishop of Sydney
 Edward White Benson (1829–1896), Archbishop of Canterbury, 1883–1896
 A. C. Bouquet (1884-1976), theologian, academic and writer
 Arthur Buxton (1882–1958), Chaplain to the Forces and Rector of All Souls Church, Langham Place
 Matthew Blagden Hale, first Bishop of Perth; later Bishop of Brisbane, social and educational pioneer
 Joseph Barber Lightfoot (1828–1889), Bishop of Durham; theologian
 Adam Loftus (1533–1605), Archbishop of Armargh and Dublin, Lord Chancellor of Ireland
 Handley Moule (1841–1920), Bishop of Durham; theologian
 Charles Perry (1807–1891), first Bishop of Melbourne
 John A. T. Robinson(1919–1983) theologian; Bishop of Woolwich, Dean of Trinity
 John Sanderson (c.1540–1602), priest and writer on logic
 The Reverend Canon Henry Spencer Stephenson, M.A. (1871–1957), chaplain to King George VI and Queen Elizabeth II
 John Stott (1921–2011), Evangelical Church Leader
 John Tiarks (1903–1974), Bishop of Chelmsford
 Richard Chenevix Trench (1807–1888), poet, Archbishop of Dublin; theorist of English Language
 Brooke Foss Westcott (1825–1901), Canon of Westminster, Bishop of Durham
 Robin Woods (1914–1997), Dean of Windsor and Bishop of Worcester
 Justin Welby (born 1956), Archbishop of Canterbury

Law and justice
 Maurice Amos, friend of Bertrand Russell and Quain Professor of Jurisprudence at University College London
 Robert Benson (1797–1844), barrister and judge
 Robert Carnwath, Lord Carnwath of Notting Hill (born 1945), Justice of the Supreme Court of the United Kingdom
 Sue Carr (born 1965), Lady Justice of Appeal
 Charles Sargent (1821 - 1900) Chief Justice of the Bombay High Court
 Nicholas Conyngham Tindal (1776–1786), celebrated lawyer and judge
 John Copley, 1st Baron Lyndhurst (1772–1863), lawyer; Lord Chancellor 1827–1830; 1834–1835; 1841–1846
 Kenelm George Digby (1890–1944), High Court judge in India
 Sir Robert Filmer (1588–1653), barrister, political philosopher
 Sir Christopher Floyd (born 1951), Lord Justice Floyd, appointed Lord Justice of Appeal in 2013
 Sir Travers Humphreys (1867–1956), judge
 George Jeffreys, 1st Baron Jeffreys (1645–1689), judge; Bloody Assizes; Lord Chancellor
 Frederic William Maitland (1850–1906), legal historian
 Sir Frederick Pollock (1845–1937), jurist
 Sir David Richards (born 1951), judge in the High Court
 Paul Sandlands (1878-1962), judge, Recorder of Birmingham 
 James Scarlett, 1st Baron Abinger (1769–1844), judge, Lord Chief Baron of the Exchequer
 Edward Vernon Utterson (c. 1776–1856), lawyer; one of the Six Clerks in Chancery; literary antiquary, collector and editor
 Lord Walker of Gestingthorpe, Lord of Appeal in Ordinary; Justice of the Supreme Court
 Humphrey Weld (of Lulworth) (1612-1685), lawyer; JP; MP; Gentleman of the Privy Chamber; landowner and recusant

Media and journalists

 Alexander Armstrong (born 1970), actor, television presenter and comedian, known for The Armstrong and Miller Show and hosting Pointless with Richard Osman
 John Drummond (1934–2006), broadcaster, arts administrator, writer, director of BBC Proms and Radio 3
 Ian Fells, energy adviser and broadcaster
 Vanessa Feltz (born 1962), journalist and broadcaster
 Stephen Frears (born 1941), film director
 Mel Giedroyc (born 1968), comedian and television presenter; The Great British Bake Off
 James Harding (born 1969), editor of The Times
 Jonathan King (born 1944), pop impresario jailed for sexually abusing boys
 India Knight (born 1965), author and journalist
 John Lloyd (born 1951), comedy writer and television producer, known for the likes of the Blackadder series, Spitting Image, Not the Nine O'Clock News, The News Quiz and QI
 Richard Osman (born 1970), television presenter and producer, co-host of Pointless
 Eddie Redmayne (born 1982), Oscar-winning actor
 Herbert Vivian (born 1865), writer, journalist and newspaper proprietor

Academics and scientists

 John Dalberg-Acton, 1st Baron Acton (1834–1902), historian
 Joseph Arthur Arkwright (1864–1944), bacteriologist, FRS
 Thomas Babington Macaulay, 1st Baron Macaulay (1800–1859), historian, politician, and essayist
 John Haden Badley (1865–1967), educationalist, founder (1893) and headmaster (1893–1935) of Bedales School
 John Bell, Professor of Law, Fellow of Pembroke College, Cambridge
 Selig Brodetsky, President of the Hebrew University of Jerusalem
 James Challis (1803–1882), astronomer; twice observed Neptune without noting it, before its discovery
 Jared Diamond (born 1937), US physiologist and biogeographer, Pulitzer Prize winner
 Simon Digby (1932–2010), Oriental scholar
 Sir Arthur Eddington (1882–1944), astronomer
 Sir James Frazer (1854–1941), anthropologist; writer, The Golden Bough
 Donald M. Friedman (1929–2019), scholar of Renaissance literature at University of California, Berkeley
 Sir Francis Galton (1822–1911), scientist; meteorology, heredity
 Christopher Grigson (1926–2001), electrical engineer and naval architect
 George Herbert, 5th Earl of Carnarvon (1866–1923), Egyptologist; funded the discovery of Tutankhamun's tomb
 Christopher Hinton, Baron Hinton of Bankside (1901–1983), nuclear engineer; constructed Calder Hall, the first large scale reactor
 Tristram Hunt (born 1974), historian and former politician
 Henry Jackson (1839–1921), classicist and reformer, Vice Master, 1914
 Ian Jacobs (born 1957), gynaecologist and academic
 David Gwilym James (1905–1968), Vice-Chancellor of the University of Southampton, 1952–1968
 Sir Richard Jebb (1841–1905), Greek scholar
 Lawrence Lessig (born 1961), leading US cyberlaw expert, founder of the Creative Commons movement, and free software advocate
 Ling Wang (1917–1994), historian of science
 Roy Lipski (1971–), entrepreneur
 George Campbell Macaulay (1852–1915), classical scholar
 Thant Myint-U (1966-), historian
 Sir Bernard Pares (1867–1956), historian in Russian history
 Nicholas Patrick (born 1964), NASA astronaut
 Richard Porson (1759–1808), classical scholar
 Alfred Radcliffe-Brown (1881–1955), social anthropologist
 Vilayanur Ramachandran (born 1947), psychologist, neuroscientist
 John Ray (1627–1705), naturalist; created the principles of plant classification
 Charles Rolls (1877–1910), co-founder of Rolls-Royce; aviator
 Hugh James Rose (1795–1838), Principal of King's College London (1836–1833)
 Victor Rothschild, 3rd Baron Rothschild (1910–1990), zoologist, suspected Soviet sympathizer
 J. F. Roxburgh (1888–1954), classicist, first head master of Stowe School
 W.A.H. Rushton (1901–1980), physiologist, one time president of the Society for Psychical Research
 Adam Sedgwick (1785–1873), geologist
 Cedric Smith (1917–2002), statistician and geneticist
 John Maynard Smith (1920–2004), evolutionary biologist and geneticist
 James Spedding (1808–1881), scholar; editor of Bacon's Works
 William Fox Talbot (1800–1877), inventor of photography
 John Arthur Todd (1908–1994), geometer
 Sir George Otto Trevelyan (1838–1928), historian; MP; father of G. M. Trevelyan
 William Thomas Tutte (1917–2002), Bletchley Park codebreaker and graph theorist
 John Waterlow (1913–2010), physiologist specialising in childhood malnutrition
 Tim Westoll (1919–1999), ornithologist
 George Michael Wickens (1918–2006), linguist and humanities scholar
 Francis Willughby (1635–1672), naturalist

Mathematicians
 Sir Michael Atiyah (1929-2019), mathematician, Fields Medal and Abel Prize winner
 Charles Babbage (1791–1871), mathematician, inventor of the automated programmable computer (transferred to Peterhouse college before graduating)
 Martin Beale (1928–1985), applied mathematician and statistician, FRS
 Hermann Bondi (1919–2005), mathematician and cosmologist
 Richard Borcherds (born 1959), mathematician, Fields Medallist
Selig Brodetsky (1888–1954), mathematician, President of the Hebrew University of Jerusalem
 Arthur Cayley (1821–1895), mathematician; non-Euclidean geometry, invented matrices
 Sydney Chapman (1888–1970), mathematician, geophysicist; kinetic theory, geomagnetism
 W. R. Dean (1896–1973), mathematician and fluid dynamicist
 Timothy Gowers (born 1963), mathematician, Fields Medal winner
 G. H. Hardy (1877–1947), mathematician; A Mathematician's Apology
 Sir James Jeans (1877–1946), astronomer, mathematician; stellar evolution
 John Edensor Littlewood (1885–1977), mathematician; Fourier Series, Zeta Function
 Edward Arthur Milne (1896–1950), mathematician
 Henry Wilbraham (25 July 1825 – 13 February 1883) periodic function.
 Augustus De Morgan (1806–1871), mathematician; symbolic logic
 Sir Isaac Newton (1642–1727), mathematician, physicist; MP (Cambridge University)
 John Pell (1610–1685), mathematician
 Srinivasa Ramanujan (1887–1920), mathematician; analytic number theory, elliptic integrals
John Frankland Rigby (1933–2014), a specialist in complex analysis
 James H. Wilkinson (1919–1986), mathematician
 John William Strutt (1842-1919), The Lord Rayleigh, mathematician

Philosophers

 Simon Blackburn (born 1944), philosopher
 C. D. Broad (1887–1971), philosopher
 Ian Hacking (born 1936), Canadian philosopher
 J. M. E. McTaggart (1866-1925)
 G. E. Moore (1873–1958), philosopher
 Frank Plumpton Ramsey (1903–1930), philosopher, mathematician, economist
 Bertrand Russell (1872–1970), philosopher
 Henry Sidgwick (1838–1900), philosopher, major proponent of women's colleges
 A. N. Whitehead (1861–1947), philosopher, mathematician
 Ludwig Wittgenstein (1889–1951), philosopher

Physicists
 Sir George Airy (1801–1895), astronomer, geophysicist
 Niels Bohr (1885–1962), quantum physicist
 Subrahmanyan Chandrasekhar (1910–1995), astrophysicist who was awarded the 1983 Nobel Prize in Physics
 Freeman Dyson (1923–2020), physicist, proponent of the Search for Extra-Terrestrial Intelligence, Templeton Prize winner
 Thomas Eckersley (1886–1959), theoretical physicist and expert on radio waves
 Otto Frisch (1904–1979), nuclear physicist; first used the term 'nuclear fission'
 Louis Harold Gray (1905–1965), invented the field of radiobiology; namesake of unit of absorbed dose Gray
 J. B. Gunn (1928–2008), physicist; inventor of the Gunn diode
 Thomas Gold (1920–2004), astrophysicist
 Brian Josephson (born 1940), physicist; predicted the Josephson effect
 James Clerk Maxwell (1831–1879), physicist; electromagnetism
 William George Penney (1909–1991), nuclear physicist
 John Polkinghorne (1930–2021), physicist, religious thinker, Templeton Prize winner
 Rajendran Raja (1948-2014), high-energy particle physicist who played a key role in the discovery of the top quark 
 Martin Ryle (1918–1984), radio astronomer; invented aperture synthesis
 Dennis William Sciama (1926–1999), physicist; played a major role in developing British physics after the Second World War
 Sir Geoffrey Ingram Taylor (1886–1975), physicist, mathematician; fluid dynamics, crystals
 Sir George Paget Thomson (1892–1975), physicist; electron diffraction
 Sir Peter Williams, physicist

Writers

 Clive Bell (1881–1964), art and literary critic; husband of Vanessa
 Charles Astor Bristed (1820–1874), American author and scholar
 George Gordon Byron, 6th Baron Byron (1788–1824), poet; "She Walks in Beauty", Don Juan
 Edward Hallet Carr (1892–1982), writer and international relations theorist
 Erskine Childers (1870–1922), writer, Irish Nationalist; The Riddle of the Sands
 Abraham Cowley (1618–1667), poet, dramatist – The Mistress
 George Crabbe (1754–1832), poet; did not matriculate
 Aleister Crowley (1875–1947), writer, poet, occultist, and 'Magician'; Magick in Theory and Practice
 Richard Cumberland (1732–1811), playwright; The Brothers, The West Indian
 Warwick Deeping (1877–1950), novelist
 Robert Devereux, 2nd Earl of Essex (1566–1601), soldier, courtier to Elizabeth I; executed for rebellion
 John Dryden (1631–1700), Poet Laureate; "Absalom and Achitophel"; translator of Virgil
 Edward FitzGerald (1809–1883), poet; Rubáiyát of Omar Khayyám
 Giles Fletcher (1588–1623), poet; "Christ's Victory" and "Triumph"
 George Gascoigne (1525–1577), poet, dramatist; "Jocasta", "The Glasse of Government"
 Edmund Gosse (1845–1928), poet, critic; On Viol and Flute
 Thom Gunn (1929–2004), Modernist poet
 George Herbert (1593–1633), poet
 Thomas Kibble Hervey (1799–1859), poet, critic
 A. E. Housman (1859–1936), poet, classical scholar
 Henry Hyndman (1842–1921), English writer and politician
 Muhammad Iqbal (1875–1938), Islamic poet and philosopher
 Stanley Mordaunt Leathes (1861–1938), poet, historian and senior civil servant
 Nathaniel Lee (1649–1692), dramatist; The Rival Queens
 John Lehmann (1907–1987), poet, man of letters; inaugurated The London Magazine
 Edward Bulwer-Lytton, 1st Baron Lytton (1803–1873), novelist; The Last Days of Pompeii; politician
 Andrew Marvell (1621–1678), poet; "Horatian Ode", "The Rehearsal Transpros'd"; MP (Hull)
 Frederick Maurice (1805–1872), theologian, writer, Christian Socialist
 A. A. Milne (1882–1956), writer; Winnie-the-Pooh
 Nicholas Monsarrat (1910–1979), novelist; The Cruel Sea, Three Corvettes
 Vladimir Nabokov (1899–1977), Russian and English novelist; Lolita
 Lenrie Peters (1932–2009), Gambian novelist, poet and educationist
 Thomas Randolph (1605–1635), poet, dramatist
 T. J. Cobden Sanderson (1840–1922), bookbinder; Arts and Crafts Movement pioneer
 Sir Henry Spelman (1562–1641), antiquary; Reliquiae Spelmannianae
 Lytton Strachey (1880–1932), biographer; Eminent Victorians; Bloomsbury Group
 Sir John Suckling (1609–1642), poet, dramatist
 Tom Taylor (1817–1880), Scottish dramatist; editor of Punch
 Alfred Tennyson, 1st Baron Tennyson (1809–1892), poet – "Maud", "In Memoriam"
 William M. Thackeray (1811–1863), novelist; Vanity Fair, Henry Esmond (dropped out after second year)
 Sir George Trevelyan, 4th Baronet (1906–1996), educator, new age thinker and writer
 George Villiers, 2nd Duke of Buckingham (1628–1687), wit, politician, dramatist; The Rehearsal; member of the 'Cabal'
 Raymond Williams (1921–1988), Marxist critic, novelist; The Country and the City
 Leonard Woolf (1880–1969), writer; husband of Virginia Woolf; Bloomsbury Group
 Geoffrey Winthrop Young (1876–1958), mountaineer and author

Sports
 George 'Gubby' Allen (1902–1989), cricketer – captained England; played in Bodyline series
 Sir George Branson (1871–1951), Cambridge rowing blue and High Court judge
 Wing Commander Alan Cassidy MBE, born 1949. Trinity, 1967. National Aerobatic Champion, 1998, 1999, 2001, 2003.
 Harry Chester Goodhart (1858–1895), twice FA Cup winner and England international footballer; Professor of Humanities at Edinburgh University
 Geoffrey Hopley, cricketer* Dar Lyon (1898–1964), first class cricketer; Chief Justice of the Seychelles
 Philip Morton (1857–1925), cricketer and schoolmaster
 Sir Peter Scott (1909–1989), artist, ornithologist; Olympic sailor (1936)
 Rev. Henry Holmes Stewart (1847–1937), FA Cup winner in 1873
 Charles Plumpton Wilson (1859–1938), England footballer and Rugby player
 H. de Winton, created the first formal set of rules for Association football (The Cambridge Rules)
 Maxwell Woosnam (1892–1965), Olympic and Wimbledon lawn tennis champion and England national football team captain
 Andy Whittall, Zimbabwe cricketer

Spies

 Anthony Blunt (1907–1983), Soviet spy; art historian
 Guy Burgess (1910–1963), Soviet spy and traitor
 John Cairncross (1913-1995), double agent; communist
 Donald Maclean (1913-1983), double agent; communist
 Michael Greenberg (1914–1992), Foreign Affairs Economist U.S. Foreign Economic Administration; Soviet spy
 Kim Philby (1911–1988), double agent; communist
 Nicholas Elliott (1916-1994), British spy
 Michael Whitney Straight (1916–2004), US magazine publisher, presidential speechwriter, Soviet spy

Business

 Norman Blackwell, Baron Blackwell, (born 1952), businessman and politician
 Sir Andrew Thomas Cahn (born 1951), Vice Chairman for Public Policy of Nomura Group; former CEO of UK Trade & Investment
 Alfred Clayton Cole (1854–1920), Governor of the Bank of England
 Sanjeev Gupta (born 1971), businessman
 Sir Robin Ibbs (born 1926), banker
 David Layton (1914–2009), National Coal Board economist and industrial relations advisor
Francis Martineau  Lupton (1848-1921), businessman, landowner, politician  and great-great grandfather  of  Catherine, Duchess of Cambridge
 Sir Michael Adrian Richards (born 1951), former UK National Cancer Director; Chief Inspector of Hospitals, Care Quality Commission, from May 2013
 Rod Smallwood (born 1950), co-manager of Iron Maiden and co-founder of Sanctuary Records
 Andy Taylor (born 1951), co-manager of Iron Maiden and co-founder of Sanctuary Records
 John Tusa (born 1936), managing director of BBC World Service
 Neville Wadia (1911–1996), Bombay industrialist and philanthropist
 Simon Wolfson, Baron Wolfson of Aspley Guise (born 1967), CEO of Next plc

Military
 Brigadier-General Charles Strathavon Heathcote-Drummond-Willoughby (1870–1949), soldier
 James Yorke Scarlett (1799–1871), British general and hero of the Crimean War
 David Stirling (1915–1990), founder of the Special Air Service

Others
 Christopher Alexander (born 1936), architect, author of The Timeless Way of Building and father of the design patterns movement
 Edward Chancellor, investment strategist and financial historian
 Hubert Chesshyre, retired British officer of arms found to have committed child sexual abuse
 Terry Eagleton (born 1943), literary critic
 Nathaniel Eaton (1609–1674), first schoolmaster at Harvard
 James Clerk Maxwell Garnett CBE (1880–1958), educationist, barrister, and peace campaigner
 Sir Sarat Kumar Ghosh (1878–1962), Indian Civil Service officer
 Antony Gormley (born 1950), sculptor, best known for Angel of the North 1968–71
 Stephen Greenhalgh (born 1967), Deputy Mayor for Policing and Crime in London
 Michael Gurstein (born 1944), Canadian community informatician
 Peter Llewellyn Gwynn-Jones (born 1940), Garter Principal King of Arms, 1995–
 Sir Stuart Milner-Barry (1906–1995), chess player, World War II codebreaker and civil servant
 William Smith O'Brien (1803–1864), Irish Nationalist
 Baron Kishichiro Okura (1882–1963), Japanese playboy and motor racing enthusiast
 St. John Philby (1885–1960), explorer of Arabia; father of Kim
 Alexander Ramsay of Mar (1919–2001), great grandson of Queen Victoria
 Sir Benegal Narsing Rau (1887–1952), Indian Civil Service officer
 Robert Vane Russell (1873-1915), Indian Civil Service officer and writer
 Anthony and Peter Shaffer (born 1926; Anthony died 2001), dramatists
 Sir Charles Villiers Stanford (1852–1924), composer, organist
 Thomas Francis Wade (1818–1895), diplomat; developed a romanization system for Mandarin Chinese that formed the basis for the Wade–Giles system
 Ralph Vaughan Williams (1872–1958), composer; Sea Symphony, Pilgrim's Progress

References
Enoch Powell was a fellow of Trinity.He was the youngest Professor of Greek in the Commonwealth,and the leading Classicist of his generation and should be mentioned here.

 List
Trinity College
Trinity College, Cambridge